Christopher Grotheer (born 30 July 1992) is a German skeleton racer who has competed since 2007. His debut at the European Cup was in November 2010. Grotheer's best Skeleton World Cup finish was 3rd in season 2012–13. He won the Gold medal in Men's Skeleton Singles contest at the 2022 Winter Olympics in Beijing, Germany's first ever in the event.

World Cup results
All results are sourced from the International Bobsleigh and Skeleton Federation (IBSF).

References

External links

1992 births
German male skeleton racers
Living people
People from Wernigerode
Olympic skeleton racers of Germany
Skeleton racers at the 2018 Winter Olympics
Skeleton racers at the 2022 Winter Olympics
Medalists at the 2022 Winter Olympics
Olympic medalists in skeleton
Olympic gold medalists for Germany
Sportspeople from Saxony-Anhalt
21st-century German people